The 1938 All-Big Six Conference football team consists of American football players chosen by various organizations for All-Big Six Conference teams for the 1938 college football season.  The selectors for the 1938 season included the Associated Press (AP).

All-Big Six selections

Backs
 Everett Kischer, Iowa State (AP-1)
 Hugh McCullough, Oklahoma (AP-1)
 Paul Christman, Missouri (AP-1 [HB]) (College Football Hall of Fame)
 Elmer Hackney, Kansas State (AP-1)

Ends
 Walter Roland Young, Oklahoma (AP-1)
 Charles Heileman, Iowa State (AP-1)

Tackles
 Cliff Duggan, Oklahoma (AP-1)
 Clyde Shugart, Iowa State (AP-1)

Guards
 Ferrel Anderson, Kansas (AP-1)
 Edwin Bock, Iowa State (AP-1)
 Ralph Stevenson, Oklahoma

Centers
 Charles Brock, Nebraska (AP-1)

Key
AP = Associated Press

See also
1938 College Football All-America Team

References

All-Big Six Conference football team
All-Big Eight Conference football teams